Laura Beatrice Upthegrove (October 5, 1896 - August 6, 1927) was a 20th-century American outlaw, bank robber, bootlegger, and occasional pirate active in southern Florida during the 1910s and 1920s, along with John Ashley. From 1915 to 1924, the Ashley Gang operated from various hideouts in the Florida Everglades. The gang robbed nearly $1 million from at least 40 banks while at the same time hijacking numerous shipments of illegal whiskey being smuggled into the state from the Bahamas. Ashley's gang was so effective that rum-running on the Florida coast virtually ceased while the gang was active. Ashley's two-man raid on the West End, Grand Bahama, in 1924 marked the first time in over a century that American pirates had attacked a British Crown colony.

Laura was born October 5, 1896, in Reddick, near Ocala. At age 14, she married 26-year-old Calvin Collier and had two children with Collier by the time she was 18. In 1916, she divorced Collier and married Earnest Tillman, quickly bearing two children. In 1920, she left Tillman for John Ashley and took up a life of crime.

Upthegrove scouted for banks to rob and drove the getaway cars. On April 17, 1925, Upthegrove married Ashley Gang member and childhood friend Joe Tracy in order to avoid testifying in his trial for murdering a taxi driver. In 1924, Laura visited Tracy in a Kissimmee jail cell, attracting Ashley's jealousy. Ashley hatched a plan to storm the jail and kill Tracy, while sharing the plan with Upthegrove as a rescue. When Upthegrove learned Ashley's true intentions, she tipped off law enforcement, who met Ashley and two other gang members at a bridge near Sebastian and killed them all.

Among poor Florida crackers, they were considered folk heroes who represented a symbol of resistance to bankers, lawmen and wealthy landowners. After Ashley's death in 1924, Upthegrove hid out in Canal Point, where she owned and operated a gas station until on August 6, 1927, she died during an argument with a man trying to buy moonshine from her. In the heat of the moment, she swallowed a bottle of Lysol disinfectant and died within minutes. Her mother was present and elected not to call a doctor, because she would be better off dead. It is unclear whether it was an accident, as some claim she mistook it for a bottle of gin, but it was widely reported that she had committed suicide. She was 30 years old.

The couple were the subject of the 1973 film Little Laura and Big John, starring Fabian and Karen Black.

Upthegrove Beach, Florida, north of Port Mayaca, is named for her family.

Footnotes

American bootleggers
People from Okeechobee County, Florida
1896 births
1927 deaths
Criminals from Florida
American female criminals
People from Marion County, Florida
1927 suicides
Suicides in Florida